The 1943 Memorial Cup final was the 25th junior ice hockey championship of the Canadian Amateur Hockey Association (CAHA). The finals were held at Maple Leaf Gardens in Toronto. CAHA president Frank Sargent chose the location to maximize profits, which were reinvested into minor ice hockey in Canada.

The George Richardson Memorial Trophy champions Oshawa Generals of the Ontario Hockey Association in Eastern Canada competed against the Abbott Cup champions Winnipeg Rangers of the Manitoba Junior Hockey League in Western Canada. It was the first Memorial Cup final series to use a best-of-seven series format. Winnipeg won their second Memorial Cup, defeating Oshawa 4 games to 2.

Scores
Game 1: Winnipeg 6-5 Oshawa
Game 2: Oshawa 6-2 Winnipeg
Game 3: Oshawa 5-3 Winnipeg
Game 4: Winnipeg 7-4 Oshawa
Game 5: Winnipeg 7-3 Oshawa
Game 6: Winnipeg 6-3 Oshawa

Winning roster
Bill Boorman, Eddie Coleman, Tom Fowler, Cal Gardner, Jack Irvine, Doug Jackson, Ben Judza, Ritchie MacDonald, Frank Mathers, George Mundrick, Joe Peterson, Church Russell, Gus Schwartz, Jack Taggart, Bill Tindall, Bill Vickers, Stan Warecki.  Coach: Bob Kinnear

References

External links
 Memorial Cup
 Canadian Hockey League

1942–43 in Canadian ice hockey
Memorial Cup tournaments
Ice hockey competitions in Toronto
Memorial Cup
1940s in Toronto